The 2009 FC Spartak Moscow season was the club's 18th season in the Russian Premier League season. Spartak finished the season in 2nd place, reaching the quarterfinals of the 2008–09 Russian Cup, where they were knocked out by Dynamo Moscow, and the Last 16 of the 2009–10 Russian Cup where FC Moscow knocked them out.

Season events
On 15 April, Michael Laudrup was sacked as manager, with Valeri Karpin being appointed as his replacement.

Squad

On loan

Left club during season

Transfers

In

Loans in

Out

Loans out

Released

Competitions

Premier League

Results by round

Results

League table

Russian Cup

2008-09

2009-10

Squad statistics

Appearances and goals

|-
|colspan="16"|Players away from the club on loan:

|-
|colspan="16"|Players who appeared for Spartak Moscow but left during the season:

|}

Goal scorers

Clean sheets

Disciplinary record

References

FC Spartak Moscow seasons
Spartak Moscow